Carlos Enrique Trinidad Gómez (18 March 1955 – 9 May 2018) was a Roman Catholic bishop.

Trinidad Gómez was born in Guatemala and was ordained to the priesthood. He served as bishop of the Roman Catholic Diocese of San Marcos, Guatemala, from 2014 until his death in 2018.

Notes

1955 births
2018 deaths
Guatemalan Roman Catholic bishops
Roman Catholic bishops of San Marcos